Barry G. Trahan (born December 27, 1954 in North Attleborough, Massachusetts) is an American realtor and politician who served one term in the Massachusetts House of Representatives as the Representative of the 11th Bristol district.

Trahan was elected in 1986 as a sticker candidate; defeating five-term incumbent Roger Goyette. Trahan served in the House as a Democrat and in 1988 sought the Democratic nomination. Trahan was defeated in the Democratic primary by New Bedford City Councilor Robert Koczera and was unable to win re-election via a second sticker campaign.

References

1954 births
Democratic Party members of the Massachusetts House of Representatives
University of Massachusetts Amherst alumni
Politicians from New Bedford, Massachusetts
Living people